Qeshlaq-e Khan Goldi Mostanlu (also Romanized as Qeshlāq-e Khān Goldī Mostānlū) is a village in Qeshlaq-e Sharqi Rural District, Qeshlaq Dasht District, Bileh Savar County, Ardabil Province, Iran. At the 2006 census, its population was 87, in 22 families.

References 

Towns and villages in Bileh Savar County